The 2016 TCR International Series Salzburgring round was the fifth round of the 2016 TCR International Series season. It took place on 4–5 June at the Salzburgring.

Mikhail Grachev won the first race, starting from ninth position, driving a Honda Civic TCR, and Jean-Karl Vernay gained the second one, driving a Volkswagen Golf GTI TCR.

Ballast
Due to the results obtained in the previous round, Stefano Comini received +30 kg, Pepe Oriola +20 kg and Mikhail Grachev +10 kg.

In addition, the Balance of Performance was reviewed for this round: the Honda Civic TCR and SEAT León TCR's both received a -10 kg bonus.

Classification

Qualifying

Notes
 — Harald Proczyk and Gianni Morbidelli was given a two-place grid penalty each, for having parked their cars in the fast lane during the red flag stoppage of qualifying.
 — Stefano Comini, Davit Kajaia, James Nash and Michela Cerruti were moved to the back of the grid for having not set a time within the 107% limit.

Race 1

Race 2

Standings after the event

Drivers' Championship standings

Model of the Year standings

Teams' Championship standings

 Note: Only the top five positions are included for both sets of drivers' standings.

References

External links
TCR International Series official website

Salzburgring
TCR
TCR